Lauren Torley (born 2 September 1999) is an English rugby union player.

Personal life
Torley attended Claytons Primary School and then Beaconsfield High School.

Career
It was in the summer of 2018 that Torley took up Touch Rugby. She had moved on to contact rugby in Newcastle by the autumn of 2019. Torley had not played sevens rugby prior to being called up by England sevens squad for training in March 2022. She was then subsequently selected for the HSBC World Rugby Sevens Series event in Langford, Canada, in late April and early May 2022. Torley was selected to play for England at the 2022 Commonwealth Games in rugby sevens. She was named in the England squad for the 2022 Rugby World Cup Sevens – Women's tournament held in Cape Town, South Africa in September 2022.

References

 

1999 births
Living people
Female rugby union players
England women's international rugby union players
English female rugby union players